San Damiano Macra is a comune (municipality) in the Province of Cuneo in the Italian region Piedmont, located about  southwest of Turin and about  northwest of Cuneo.

San Damiano Macra borders the following municipalities: Cartignano, Castelmagno, Celle di Macra, Dronero, Frassino, Macra, Melle, Roccabruna, and Sampeyre.

History
In 1716 it merged with Pagliero. In 1929, the municipalities of Lottulo and Paglieres were joined to San Damiano.

References

External links
 

Cities and towns in Piedmont